Hedonism II is an adults-only vacation resort in Jamaica, owned and operated by Marshmallow Ltd, headed by Harry Lange.  The resort has areas reserved for naturism and it is known for its sexually liberal culture. , only Hedonism II is in operation. There was never a Hedonism I, and Hedonism III closed in 2010.

History 

Hedonism II opened in 1976 as "Negril Beach Village" and was given its current name in 1981; it was built by the Government of Jamaica at a cost of $10 million. It occupies  at the northern end of Negril beach and has 280 rooms in two-story buildings. A 50% interest in the hotel was bought by the SuperClubs in 1989, a resort company owned by John Issa & his family, for $12.25 million.  On February 26, 2013, the resort was sold to Marshmallow Ltd headed by Harry Lange with a minority stock held by the Issa family and Kevin Levee, a 28-year employee of SuperClubs and its current general manager. Harry W. Lange's company is now named PB&J Resorts II (Jamaica) Limited.

It reopened on October 14, 2010, as SuperFun Beach Resort and Spa catering to a wider market through additional tour operators. However, SuperFun Beach Resort entered receivership in March 2011 and closed in June 2011. While it was an adult-only resort, SuperFun did not allow topless or nude sunbathing. The property was leased to SuperClubs by the Development Bank of Jamaica, while the hotel's first-ranked secured lenders were Caribbean Development Bank, PanCaribbean, and Development Bank of Jamaica.

Hedonism II often receives bookings from tour companies, who cater to swingers.

Controversies

Public nudity is illegal in Jamaica, but the laws are not enforced and may not apply inside the private resort. A nude wedding of eight couples in 2001 at Hedonism III caused protests by the government tourist office and radio talk show hosts, who called the event "improper and offensive." In February 2003, 29 couples were involved in another round of nude weddings at the Hedonism III; Hedonism resorts host nudist and swingers conventions: it has been alleged that open sex is common, including in the hot tubs at night. SuperClubs owner John Issa said he was not aware of this.

Issa also said he was not running a "whorehouse" and that, to his knowledge, "whores are not working" in his Hedonism hotels. Issa sued two employees of Unique Vacations in Miami, Florida, over e-mails sent in 2007 and 2008 which he said contained "defamatory statements" about activities at Hedonism Resorts and sought damages of an unspecified amount for what he said were false and malicious statements.

Issa said he feels satisfied with Hedonism's image of decadence and debauchery and is satisfied with the idea, expressed on his website, that "When it's good it's oh so good and when it's bad it's even better and yes, everything you ever heard is true". Issa allegedly promoted bisexual activities at Hedonism III.

In September 2009, Hedonism Resorts lost a WIPO trial against Relevansanalys related to the registration of the Internet domain name 'hedonismhotels.com'.

In popular culture
A travel/humor book about the resort, titled "The Naked Truth About Hedonism II: A totally unauthorized naughty, but nice guide to Jamaica's very adult resort," by Chris Santilli, was released in its 3rd edition December 2019.
In the "Dwight's Speech" episode of The Office, Kevin Malone suggests that Jim Halpert go to Hedonism for a vacation. He describes it as "like Club Med, but everything is naked."
In 2010, comedian Daniel Tosh of Tosh.0 lampooned the antics of “Hedo Rick” in a viral video that featured  an aging patron of Hedonism II parading in a speedo and promoting the wild women and sexual nature of the resort.
In season 2, episode 10 of the show Workaholics, the main characters scramble to have a fake passport made for Blake in an effort to spend their Thanksgiving at Hedonism II.
Hedonism has appeared several times since 2014 in Naked News.

See also
 List of hotels in Jamaica

References

External links

Aerial view of Hedonism II
Aerial view of Hedonism III
Superclubs' Hedonism Resorts web site 
Hedonism II trip reports
 

Hospitality companies of the United States
Resorts in Jamaica
Hotels in Jamaica
Hotels established in 1976
Hotel buildings completed in 1976